South Fork is an unincorporated community semi-ghost town in Elko County, Nevada in the United States.

History
This region was settled by white men in 1867. South Fork was a stagecoach stop and there was a big hotel which closed in 1871. In 1874, the post office was reopened and closed in 1877. The area is now known as Shepherd's Station, a recreation park that offers fishing, hunting and camping.

Notes

External links
Official page of the Park
Information about South Fork State Recreation

Unincorporated communities in Nevada
Ghost towns in Elko County, Nevada
Elko, Nevada micropolitan area
Ghost towns in Nevada
Unincorporated communities in Elko County, Nevada